Stay Grounded is a global network of more than 160 member organizations promoting alternatives to aviation to address climate change. Founded in 2016, their work is rooted in fostering sustainable transport and campaigning against controversial climate strategies. The network consists of local airport opposition groups, climate justice activists, NGOs, trade unions and academics, among others.

Mission
Stay Grounded's mission is rooted in campaigning for a reduction in aviation and airport expansion and supporting initiatives that promote alternatives to flying such as night trains and ships. The network's members campaign against offsetting emissions, geo-engineering and biofuels.

History
In October 2016, the ICAO held a conference on the aviation industry’s response to climate change. Their proposal was to have further aviation growth, incorporated with offsets that aimed to represent a way for airline passengers or 'emitters' to be encouraged to reduce emissions from other sectors as an individualized contribution towards global emission reductions. Climate activists viewed this proposal as a greenwashing strategy. While the conference was taking place, a group of locally-affected opposition groups and organizations coordinated complimentary global action days under the name Stay Grounded. Aviation Growth Cancelled Due to Climate Change, in various countries, including Austria, Mexico, the United Kingdom, Canada, Turkey, France and Australia. In conjunction with these actions, a petition was signed by 50 organisations, including Attac Europe, Friends of the Earth International, Global Justice Now, Greenpeace, Indigenous Environmental Network, among several others, which are united against airport expansion projects. A civil society statement was also signed by almost 100 organizations and NGOs, including Greenpeace and Friends of the Earth, rejecting the ICAO’s proposal of offsetting the aviation industry’s emissions on the basis that it would propel global warming beyond 1.5 °C. 

Magdalena Heuwieser, a climate justice activist living in Germany, and Mira Kapfinger, an Austrian climate justice activist, are founders of Stay Grounded. Since 2017, they have been organizing network meetings twice a year.

Media attention
Since their inception in 2016, Stay Grounded has received attention as a result of activism and campaigns. Significant moments include the November 2019 climate protest at Berlin's Tegel airport in which several climate protesters staged a sit-in, resulting in traffic jams and delays for airline passengers. Approximately 50 members of the group gathered in the main entrance of a terminal to stage the sit-in while another 80 people organized a public demonstration. Many of the climate activists present were dressed in penguin costumes, and carried signs that urged people to think of alternative forms of transport instead of flying. 

In light of the Covid-19 pandemic and the ensuing economic recovery packages, the Stay Grounded network responded by launching a petition under the hashtag, #SavePeopleNotPlanes in which they are campaigning against allowing the aviation industry to receive bailouts during and after the pandemic.

References

External links
 Official website

Non-governmental organizations
Climate justice
Advocacy groups
International environmental organizations
Aviation and the environment